Strangeways, Here We Come is the fourth and final studio album by English rock band the Smiths. It was released on 28 September 1987 by Rough Trade Records, several months after the group had disbanded. All of the songs were composed by Johnny Marr, with lyrics written and sung by Morrissey. 

Rolling Stone said the record "stands as one of their best and most varied". Slant Magazine listed the album at No. 69 on its list of "Best Albums of the 1980s", writing that "Whether or not Strangeways, Here We Come ended the Smiths' brief career with their best album has been the subject of considerable debate for nearly a quarter century, but it definitively stands as the band's most lush, richest work."

The album reached number two on the UK Albums Chart, staying in the chart for 17 weeks. The album also became an international success, peaking at number 16 in the European Albums Chart; from sales covering the 18 major European countries, staying in that chart for nine weeks. The album was certified gold by the British Phonographic Industry on 1 October 1987 and also by the Recording Industry Association of America on 19 September 1990.

Recording
The Smiths recorded what was to be their final studio album at the Wool Hall studios in Beckington, Somerset, England (established and then-owned by the band Tears for Fears). Between the album's recording in March and its release in September 1987, Johnny Marr left the group, ending the band. Strangeways is the only Smiths album to feature Morrissey playing a musical instrument: piano, on the song "Death of a Disco Dancer".

Marr felt the band was ready to enter a new musical phase, and was determined to avoid a formula and move away from their previous "jingle jangle" sound. He started to look for different influences, finding an interest in the Beatles' self-titled 1968 album. Marr further stated that he intended Strangeways as an homage to early records by the Walker Brothers. The band's instrumentation branched out as well, including synthesised saxophone, string arrangements on keyboards, and drum machine additions.

Recording in the Wool Hall made the sessions more relaxed, as the wine cellar was fully stocked and producer Stephen Street came slowly to understand the idea that the writing partners Morrissey and Marr were trying to put forth. Street (who engineered previous Smiths efforts) later said that there would always be late-night drinking following the recording sessions. "That was always after Morrissey had gone to bed ... it wasn't really his bag. We'd carry on finishing overdubs and then the records would come out. We'd be partying all hours". Ed Power wrote in The Independent that "Everyone else was more than willing to join [Marr] in this new love affair. Parties at Wool House became a nightly event. With Morrissey tucked up in bed with his favourite Sylvia Plath anthology, the musicians would cover their favourite Spinal Tap songs into the wee hours".

Morrissey and Marr have stated that the album is the band's best, with Morrissey adding, "We say it quite often. At the same time. In our sleep. But in different beds". Drummer Mike Joyce also named the album as the band's best.

Two final songs were recorded in May 1987 to provide B-sides for the album's lead single, "Girlfriend in a Coma". These were the Smiths' last recordings together. Three more singles were taken from Strangeways, Here We Come; their B-sides were drawn from archival recordings.

Artwork and title
The sleeve for Strangeways, Here We Come, which was designed by Morrissey, features a murky shot of actor Richard Davalos, best known for appearing in the 1955 film East of Eden. In the photo, Davalos is looking at his costar in that film, James Dean, who is cropped from the image. Dean was a hero of Morrissey's, about whom the singer wrote a book called James Dean Is Not Dead. Five years later, when designing the sleeves for the U.S. release of WEA's Best... I compilation, Morrissey again chose Davalos as a cover star, and Davalos is looking at Dean, who is once again cropped.

As revealed in Jo Slee's collection of Smiths and Morrissey sleeve artwork, Peepholism, Davalos was not the original choice for cover star. Morrissey wanted to use a still of Harvey Keitel in Martin Scorsese's 1967 film I Call First (also known as Who's That Knocking at My Door), but Keitel declined to allow him to use the image. In 1991, Keitel relented, and the image was used on T-shirts and stage backdrops for Morrissey's 1991 Kill Uncle Tour.

The album takes its title from Manchester's notorious Strangeways Prison (now called HM Prison Manchester), whilst the line "Borstal, here we come" is taken from the novel Billy Liar. "Strangeways, of course, is that hideous Victorian monstrosity of a prison operating 88 to a cell," Morrissey has said.

Marr has said "I've learned to love the title ... it was a bit overstating things somewhat. A little bit obvious. But it's OK. I was always intrigued by the word Strangeways. I remember as a kid, when I first heard that the prison was really called that, I wondered had it not occurred to anybody to change the name? It's still befuddling, really". Morrissey has also stated, "Really it's me throwing both arms to the skies and yelling 'Whatever next?'"

Reception

Commercial
The album rose to No. 2 on the UK Albums Chart and No. 55 on the US Billboard 200.

Critical

The album ranked number 3 among "Albums of the Year" for 1987 in the annual NME critics' poll, and "Girlfriend in a Coma" ranked number 11 among songs. In 2000 it was voted number 601 in Colin Larkin's All Time Top 1000 Albums.

Reviewing the album for AllMusic, Stephen Thomas Erlewine said it was "a subtly shaded and skilled album, one boasting a fuller production than before ... while it doesn't match The Queen Is Dead or The Smiths, it is far from embarrassing and offers a summation of the group's considerable strengths."

Track listing

Personnel
The Smiths
Morrissey – vocals, piano ("Death of a Disco Dancer"), handclaps ("Paint a Vulgar Picture")
Johnny Marr – guitar, piano, keyboards, harmonica, marimba ("A Rush and a Push and the Land Is Ours"), harmonium ("Unhappy Birthday"), autoharp ("I Won't Share You"), synthesised strings and saxophone arrangements, additional vocals ("Death at One's Elbow"), handclaps ("Paint a Vulgar Picture")
Andy Rourke – bass guitar, keyboards, handclaps ("Paint a Vulgar Picture")
Mike Joyce – drums, percussion, handclaps ("Paint a Vulgar Picture")

Additional musicians
Stephen Street – additional drum machine programming ("I Started Something I Couldn't Finish", "Paint a Vulgar Picture", "Death at One's Elbow"), sound effects ("Last Night I Dreamt That Somebody Loved Me", "Death at One's Elbow")

Technical
Johnny Marr – co-producer
Morrissey – co-producer
Stephen Street – co-producer, string arrangement ("Girlfriend in a Coma")
Steve Williams – assistant engineer
Tim Young – mastering
Steve Wright – photography

Charts

Certifications

References

The Smiths albums
1987 albums
Rough Trade Records albums
Albums produced by Stephen Street
Sire Records albums